Cochylimorpha fucosa is a species of moth of the family Tortricidae. It is found in Italy, Romania, Turkey and Iran.

The wingspan is 21–25 mm. Adults have been recorded on wing from June to July.

References

Moths described in 1970
Cochylimorpha
Taxa named by Józef Razowski
Moths of Europe
Moths of Asia